Martina Colmegna and Amy Zhu were the defending champions but chose not to participate.

Angelica Moratelli and Eva Vedder won the title, defeating Yuliana Lizarazo and Aurora Zantedeschi in the final, 6–3, 6–2.

Seeds

Draw

Draw

References

External Links
Main Draw

Internazionali di Tennis del Friuli Venezia Giulia - Doubles
2022 Women's Doubles